Karekin Deveciyan (1868 in Harput – 1964 in Istanbul) was a Turkish-Armenian zoologist who wrote Türkiye'de Balık ve Balıkçılık, one of the first scientific studies on fish and fisheries in Turkey. He served in the Ottoman bureaucracy and held offices related to fishery.  He was the grandfather of French politician Patrick Devedjian.

References

Further reading 
Karekin Deveciyan's book publish by Aras written in Turkish

1868 births
1964 deaths
Armenians from the Ottoman Empire
Turkish people of Armenian descent
Scientists from the Ottoman Empire
Turkish zoologists
People from Elazığ
Date of birth missing
Date of death missing